Gordon John de Brouwer  is a senior Australian public servant serving as the Secretary for Public Sector Reform since June 22, 2022 under the Albanese Government. He was previously Secretary of the Department of the Environment and Energy from 2016 to 2017.

Career

Academia
de Brouwer was Professor of Economics in the Crawford School of Economics and Government at the Australian National University, from January 2000 to March 2004. This included a period as Executive Director of the Australia-Japan Research Centre and Director of the School's Research Committee. De Brouwer was also a member of the University's research program on Japan’s Economy and Government and on Korea’s Economy and Government.  De Brouwer remains an adjunct professor with the ANU.

Public service
De Brouwer was appointed Secretary of the Department of the Environment in September 2013 after previously serving in the Department of Prime Minister and Cabinet.

De Brouwer was the Associate Secretary in the Domestic Policy Group at the Department of the Prime Minister and Cabinet under the Rudd Government. In this position, de Brouwer provided departmental and cross-government policy advice to the Prime Minister on domestic policy and G20 matters and was also the senior official representing Australia’s interests in the G20. Dr de Brouwer played a key role in the development of Australia's $42 billion economic stimulus package. Former secretary of the Department of the Prime Minister and Cabinet, Terry Moran, stated in his witness statement to the Home Insulation Royal Commission that de Brouwer was given primary responsibility for devising environmental initiatives and presenting them to Cabinet, including the Energy Efficient Homes Package that included the Home Insulation Program that resulted in the deaths of four installers. de Brouwer also led the Australian delegation to the 2009 United Nations Climate Change Conference. de Brouwer was appointed as Australia's G20 sherpa by Kevin Rudd. It was reported in WikiLeaks cables that De Brouwer lamented to his contacts in the US Embassy that "PM&C foreign policy staff have been run ragged answering the PM's (Rudd's) queries and supporting his interaction with foreign officials.

De Brouwer became the President of the Institute of Public Administration (IPAA) ACT Division on 9 June 2016  until his retirement as Secretary, then took on the role as National President of IPAA in September 2019.

De Brouwer was appointed Secretary for Public Sector Reform for a 2-year term on 22 June 2022 under Katy Gallagher as Minister for the Public Service.

Awards and honours
De Brouwer studied in Japan in 1987-89 and 1994 with support from the Monbusho and Japan Foundation scholarships.

De Brouwer was awarded a Public Service Medal in 2011 for outstanding public service in the development of international economic policy, particularly in the formulation of the Australian Government's agenda to establish the G20 as the pre-eminent global economic forum.

In 2015, de Brouwer was awarded the Legion of Honour by the French Government.

In 2017, de Brouwer was awarded a National Fellowship of the Institute of Public Administration Australia.

References

Living people
Year of birth missing (living people)
Place of birth missing (living people)
Australian public servants
Recipients of the Public Service Medal (Australia)
Australian National University alumni
University of Melbourne alumni
Chevaliers of the Légion d'honneur
Academic staff of the Australian National University